Ptyssoptera acrozyga is a moth of the family Palaephatidae that is found in Western Australia.

References

Moths described in 1893
Palaephatidae